McCormick County is a county located in the U.S. state of South Carolina. As of the 2020 census, its population was 9,526, making it the second least-populous county in South Carolina. Its county seat is McCormick. The county was formed in 1916 from parts of Edgefield, Abbeville, and Greenwood Counties.

History 
The county was founded in 1916 and was named after Cyrus McCormick. The largest town and county seat is McCormick.

Geography

It is the smallest county in South Carolina by land area and second-smallest by total area. McCormick County is in the Savannah River basin.

National protected area
 Sumter National Forest (part)

State and local protected areas/sites 
 Baker Creek State Park
 Eden Hall
 Hamilton Branch State Recration Area
 Hickory Knob State Resort Park
 Leroys Ferry Recreation Area
 Long Cane Creek Picnic Area
 Parksville Recreation Area
 Price's Mill
 Savannah Lakes Beach
 Steven's Creek Heritage Preserve (part)

Major water bodies 
 Clarks Hill Lake
 Savannah River
 Steven Creek

Adjacent Counties 
 Greenwood County - northeast
 Edgefield County - east
 Columbia County, Georgia - south
 Lincoln County, Georgia - west
 Elbert County, Georgia - northwest
 Abbeville County - northwest

Major highways

Demographics

2020 census

As of the 2020 United States census, there were 9,526 people, 3,957 households, and 2,513 families residing in the county.

2010 census
As of the 2010 United States Census, there were 10,233 people, 4,027 households, and 2,798 families living in the county. The racial makeup of the county was 49.7% black or African American, 48.7% white, 0.3% Asian, 0.1% Pacific islander, 0.1% American Indian, 0.2% from other races, and 0.9% from two or more races. Those of Hispanic or Latino origin made up 0.8% of the population. In terms of ancestry, 10.7% were English, 10.2% were American, 10.2% were German, and 6.0% were Irish.

Of the 4,027 households, 21.0% had children under the age of 18 living with them, 50.4% were married couples living together, 15.2% had a female householder with no husband present, 30.5% were non-families, and 27.4% of all households were made up of individuals. The average household size was 2.22 and the average family size was 2.65. The median age was 50.0 years.

The median income for a household in the county was $35,858 and the median income for a family was $43,021. Males had a median income of $32,606 versus $28,067 for females. The per capita income for the county was $19,411. About 14.2% of families and 18.2% of the population were below the poverty line, including 37.6% of those under age 18 and 7.9% of those age 65 or over.

2000 census
As of the census of 2000, there were 9,958 people, 3,558 households and 2,604 families living in the county. The population density was 28 people per square mile (11/km2). There were 4,459 housing units at an average density of 12 per square mile (5/km2). The racial makeup of the county was 53.88% Black or African American, 44.78% White, 0.07% Native American, 0.29% Asian, 0.03% Pacific Islander, 0.38% from other races, and 0.57% from two or more races. 0.86% of the population were Hispanic or Latino of any race.

There were 3,558 households, out of which 24.80% had children under the age of 18 living with them, 51.80% were married couples living together, 17.60% had a female householder with no husband present and 26.80% were non-families. 24.40% of all households were made up of individuals, and 10.20% had someone living alone who was 65 years of age or older. The average household size was 2.39 and the average family size was 2.82.

In the county, the population was spread out, with 19.50% under the age of 18, 8.30% from 18 to 24, 27.60% from 25 to 44, 28.10% from 45 to 64 and 16.50% who were 65 years of age or older. The median age was 41 years. For every 100 females there were 113.70 males. For every 100 females age 18 and over, there were 115.80 males.

The median income for a household in the county was $31,577, and the median income for a family was $38,822. Males had a median income of $28,824 versus $21,587 for females. The per capita income for the county was $14,770. About 15.10% of families and 17.90% of the population were below the poverty line, including 26.50% of those under age 18 and 11.90% of those age 65 or over.

Government and politics
Like most rural South Carolina counties with a tight Black-white population ratio, the Democratic Party has fared well in McCormick County compared to others across the South, especially with the national party's cultural turn to the left in the 2000s and 2010s. However, in 2016 Donald Trump won the county by one fewer vote than Barack Obama did in 2012, marking the first GOP victory in the area since Richard Nixon in 1972.

Communities

Towns
 McCormick (county seat and largest town)
 Parksville
 Plum Branch

Census-designated places
 Clarks Hill
 Modoc
 Mount Carmel
 Willington

Notable people
 Johnny Letman -  Musician
 Patrick Noble -  Governor of South Carolina (1838-1940)

See also
 List of counties in South Carolina
 National Register of Historic Places listings in McCormick County, South Carolina
 South Carolina State Parks
 List of national forests of the United States

References

External links

 
 

 
1916 establishments in South Carolina
Populated places established in 1916